Jukka Piekkanen (born 22 November 1975) is a Finnish former diver. He competed at the 2000 Summer Olympics and the 2004 Summer Olympics.

References

External links
 

1975 births
Living people
Finnish male divers
Olympic divers of Finland
Divers at the 2000 Summer Olympics
Divers at the 2004 Summer Olympics
Divers from Helsinki